Anarchy was an anarchist monthly magazine produced in London from March 1961 until December 1970. It was published by Freedom Press and edited by its founder, Colin Ward with cover art on many issues by Rufus Segar. The magazine included articles on anarchism and reflections on current events from an anarchist perspective, e.g. workers control, criminology, squatting.

The magazine had irregular contributions from writers such as Marie Louise Berneri, Paul Goodman, George Woodcock, Murray Bookchin, and Nicholas Walter.

A second series of Anarchy was published into the 1980s with an editorship that included Chris Broad and Phil Ruff.

Freedom Press later published A Decade of Anarchy 1961-1970: Selections from the Monthly Journal Anarchy which collected writing from the first series as edited by Colin Ward. Cover designs for every issue are collected in Autonomy: The Cover Designs of Anarchy 1961‒1970 edited by Daniel Poyner.

See also
 The Raven: Anarchist Quarterly (1987 to 2003)

References

External links 
Anarchy issue covers from Internet Archive
Anarchy issues
Anarchy archive from The Sparrows' Nest
Anarchy issues #23 and #40 at Libcom.org
"Work" reading of an excerpt from Anarchy 101, published in issue 59
Full-text articles from Anarchy: a journal of anarchist ideas

 

Anarchist periodicals published in the United Kingdom
Monthly magazines published in the United Kingdom
Defunct political magazines published in the United Kingdom
Magazines published in London
Magazines established in 1961
Magazines disestablished in 1970